Adrienne Fairhall is a University Professor in the Department of Physiology and Biophysics and an adjunct Professor in the Departments of Physics and Applied Mathematics, as well as the director of the Computational Neuroscience Program and co-director of the Institute for Neuroengineering at the University of Washington.

Fairhall is primarily known for her work on dynamic neural computation, particularly with regards to the interplay between cellular and circuit dynamics and coding, and she has received numerous awards for her work in the field including a Sloan Fellowship, a McKnight Scholar Award, a Burroughs-Wellcome Fellowship, and an Allen Distinguished Investigator award.

Fairhall presently runs the Fairhall laboratory at the University of Washington.

Early life and education
Fairhall was raised in Australia, she obtained her honors degree in theoretical physics working with Robert Dewar at the Australian National University in Canberra, Australia. She then joined the lab of Itamar Procaccia at the Weizmann Institute of Science where she completed her PhD in physics.

Career
Following a brief stint at the NEC Corporation, Fairhall then joined Princeton University's Department of Molecular Biology as a postdoctoral researcher. In 2004, she left that position to become an associate professor at the University of Washington, a position that eventually led to a full professorship. She further went on to become the director of the University of Washington Computational Neuroscience Program and co-director of the University of Washington Institute for Neuroengineering

Fairhall has also been involved in a number of computational neuroscience educational programs and workshops, most notably by way directing the Methods in Computational Neuroscience course at the Marine Biological Laboratory in Woods Hole, as well as creating the Coursera course on the subject.

Personal life
Fairhall is married to Blaise Agüera y Arcas, a physicist whom she met during a neural network circuitry class at Marine Biological Laboratory in Woods Hole and with whom she has one child.

Select publications

Awards and honors 
 Sloan Fellowship
 McKnight Fellowship
 Burroughs Wellcome Fellowship
 Allen Distinguished Investigator

References

External links

 Laboratory page
  University of Washington Profile page

Living people
Australian neuroscientists
University of Washington faculty
Australian women neuroscientists
Sloan Fellows
Australian National University alumni
Weizmann Institute of Science alumni
Princeton University people
21st-century Australian scientists
21st-century women scientists
Year of birth missing (living people)